Paraceraurus is a genus of trilobites that lived in the Ordovician period (485.4 to 443.4 Ma). Its remains have been found in China, Estonia, Sweden and North America. These trilobites have a rounded and moderately convex cephalon. Glabella is convex or flattened, with a sub-rectangular outline. Thorax shows eleven segments.

Selected species
 Paraceraurus exsul 
 Paraceraurus aculeatus
 Paraceraurus ingricus
 Paraceraurus gladiator
 Paraceraurus macrophthalmus
 Paraceraurus spinulosus

References

 Trilobite: Eyewitness to Evolution by Richard Fortey
 Trilobites of the families Cheiruridae and Encrinuridae from Estonia.] Geoloogia Instituudi Uurimused [Trud Inst Geol Acad Sci Est SSR] Tallinn, 3 1958: 165–205, 210–212. [Zoological Record Volume 95]
 V. Klikushin, A. Evdokimov, A. Pilipyuk. Ordovician Trilobites of the St. Petersburg Region, Russia, 2009.

Cheiruridae
Ordovician trilobites of North America
Ordovician trilobites of Asia
Phacopida genera